Adem Doğan (born 5 October 2001) is a Turkish professional footballer who plays as a centre back for TFF Third League club Orduspor 1967.

Professional career
A youth product of Kayserispor, Adem made his professional debut for them in a 3–2 Süper Lig loss to Yeni Malatyaspor on 18 May 2018, at the age of 16

On 3 September 2019, he joined 52 Orduspor on a season–long loan deal.

References

External links
 
 
 

2001 births
People from Kocasinan
Living people
Turkish footballers
Turkey youth international footballers
Association football defenders
Kayserispor footballers
Niğde Anadolu FK footballers
Süper Lig players
TFF Second League players
TFF Third League players